This is a list of works by the Swiss-born French sculptor James Pradier (1790–1852). He was best known for his work in the neoclassical style.

Works in cathedrals and churches

Public statues and monuments in Paris

Busts and statues of Louis Philippe I and other members of Royal family

Pardier was well regarded by the king and was commissioned to execute several busts and statues of family members as well as effigies for family tombs. Below is a photograph of Pradier's 1834 bust of Louis Philippe I (1773-1850) who reigned from 1830 to 1848 in the period known as the July monarchy. This bust can be seen in the Musée du Louvre département des Sculptures. Several busts of the King were executed by Pradier. The first was in 1830, a plaster bust celebrating Louis-Philippe's accession to the French throne and in a bust executed in 1841, the king is depicted wearing a crown of oak leaves. Pradier also executed works depicting Maria Amalia of Naples and Sicily, the King's wife. One such work can be seen in the Chateau de Chantilly. When Ferdinand-Philippe Duke of Orléans, the King's eldest son was killed in an accident in 1842, Louis-Philippe commissioned Pradier to take casts of Ferdinand-Philippe's head, hands and feet to ensure that any future sculptures would be true to his son's likeness and Pradier produced several works using these casts including a memorial bust, a monument to the Duke and a bronze medallion

Public statues and monuments outside of Paris

Pradier's grandfather had been from the Gard region and apart from his work in Paris his friends in the French MIDI, particularly Nîmes, helped him secure commissions in that area. Some of these are listed below.

Funerary sculpture

Works in the Louvre and Musée d'Orsay

Early works whilst a student in Paris and Rome

Works in museums outside of Paris

Works located in Geneva

After he finished his studies at the École de Dessin in Geneva and went up to Paris, the authorities in Geneva, aware of his talent, organised bursaries for him in 1809 and 1812 to help defray his expenses at the École des Beaux-Arts and to perhaps help cement this relationship he sent his Prix de Rome winning entry of 1813 to the city.  However, when in 1815 he tried to get the Geneva authorities to help finance the execution of a marble version of the composition "Orphée pleurant Eurydice" which they turned down, he perhaps realised that assistance from Geneva would be of a limited nature. He did however keep contact with friends and associates there and in 1819 the "Sociéte des Arts" in Geneva made him a "associé honoraire" and in that year they gave Pradier an order for two of the busts being commissioned to decorate the front of the "Orangerie du Jardin botanique" just created by A.P.de Candolle for the "Promenade des Bastions". Pradier was asked to execute the bust of Jean Jacques Rousseau in 1821 and Charles Bonnet in 1822. In 1825 he was asked to execute two further busts to decorate the Musée des Beaux-Arts just being built thanks to the generosity of the Rath family.  1830 saw the project to establish a monument honouring Rousseau come to fruition, Pradier's bronze being one of his best known works. In 1843 Pradier received private commissions to execute busts of the economist Jean Charles Léonard de Sismondi and Abraham Auguste Saladin de Budé. A commission for the bust of Augustin-Pyramus de Candolle followed in 1845 and Pradier captured interest by producing a cylindrical pedestal for this with remarkable reliefs. This was also intended for the "Jardin botanique des Bastions". Pradier's final sculpture executed for Geneva was the bust of Guillaume-Henri Dufour.

After Pradier's death the Musée de Geneve acquired several original plaster models and a huge number of his design drawings. Slowly but surely the museum's collection grew and today a collection of more than 120 reliefs, statues and statuettes as well as design drawings are a fitting tribute to one of Geneva's finest sons.

Other works by Pradier are to be seen in Switzerland and details are given below. Pradier also sent to Geneva four medallions to be added to the Frédéric-César de La Harpe monument at Rolle on the Ile de la Harpe.

Miscellaneous

Gallery of images

The tomb of James Pradier

The Pradier family tomb was designed by the architect Antoine Martin Garnaud and comprises a large sarcophagus above which is a tall pedestal at the top of which is a niche containing a marble bust of Pradier by Eugène-Louis Lequesne and below this there are a series of bas-reliefs representing some of Pradier's best known works, executed by former pupils of Pradier, these being "Cyparisse" by Hippolyte Ferrat a work presented to the Paris Salon in 1833, "Niobide blessé" by Jacques Léonard Maillet, "Psyché" by Eugène Guillaume, "Nyssia" by Augustin Courtet, "La Poésie légère" by Félix Roubaud, "Pélion" by François Clément Moreau and "Phryné" by Antoine Étex. The monument was inaugurated in 1857. For a full description of the grave and details of the theft of three of the reliefs see "Étude :Le tombeau de Pradier au cimetière du Père-Lachaise" by Douglas Siler.

References

Further reading
James Pradier (1790-1852) et la sculpture française de la génération romantique. Catalogue raisonné. Claude Lapaire Zürich/Lausanne: Swiss Institute for Art Research; Milan: 5 Continents Edition, 2010. 512 pp; 838 duotone illustrations. 

French sculptors
French male sculptors
Lists of works of art
Sculptures by artist